The Differ Cup is a cross-promotional professional wrestling tournament in Japan, contested among several teams of junior heavyweight tag teams, each typically representing a particular promotion. It was originally held biennially, first in 2003, then in 2005 and finally in 2007. After a ten-year hiatus, the tournament was revived in 2017. Since the founding of the Global Professional Wrestling Alliance in 2006, the Differ Cup had been considered a production of the GPWA, with several GPWA member promotions participating.

The tournament, featuring eight teams, would be held over two nights at the Tokyo Differ Ariake, which the tournament derived its name from. The quarterfinals and semifinals were held on the first night, with the finals and third place matches, as well as several non-tournament bouts, contested on the second.

Results

List of winners

2003
The 2003 Differ Cup was held on February 8 and February 9. It involved the following teams:

Kudo and Mikami (DDT)
Tetsuhiro Kuroda and Chocoball Mukai (WEW)
Yoshihito Sasaki and Tatsuhito Takaiwa (Zero1-Max)
Masao Orihara and Ikuto Hidaka (Michinoku Pro)
Kenta and Kotaro Suzuki (Pro Wrestling Noah)
The Great Takeru and Kappa Kozou (IWA Japan)
Último Dragón and Yossino (Toryumon Japan)
Jun Kasai and Gran Naniwa (freelance)

2005
The 2005 Differ Cup was held on May 7 and May 8. The winners, Kenta and Naomichi Marufuji, were also the GHC Junior Heavyweight Champions; their opponents in the finals, Minoru Fujita and Ikuto Hidaka, were the Zero1-Max International Lightweight Tag Team Champions. The following teams were involved:

Tiger Emperor and Super Shisa (freelance)
Takehiro Murahama and Katsuhiko Nakajima (freelance)
Minoru Fujita and Ikuto Hidaka (Zero1-Max)
Taka Michinoku and Psycho (K-Dojo)
Kenta and Naomichi Marufuji (Noah)
Kota Ibushi and Kudo (DDT)
Kaz Hayashi and Leonardo Spanky (freelance)
Gentaro and Takashi Sasaki (freelance)

2007
The third incarnation of the Differ Cup was held on May 5 and May 6.  The event featured the following teams:

Yoshinobu Kanemaru and Ippei Ota (Noah)
Madoka and Kengo Mashimo (K-Dojo)
Harashima and Kota Ibushi (DDT)
Manabu Hara and Katsumi Usuda (BML)
Kagetora and Banana Senga (El Dorado)
Ikuto Hidaka and Osamu Namiguchi (Zero1-Max)
Keizo Matsuda and Kappa Kozou (IWA Japan)
Black Emperor and Pentagon Viper (GPWA)

2017
After a ten-year hiatus, Differ Cup's revival was announced on September 28, 2017. The tournament took place on November 28 and featured teams from DDT Pro-Wrestling, Pro Wrestling Freedoms, Pro Wrestling Noah and Pro Wrestling Zero1. The event featured the following teams:

Hitoshi Kumano and Katsuhiko Nakajima (Noah)
Konosuke Takeshita and Yuki Ueno (DDT)
Jun Kasai and Tomoya Hirata (Freedoms)
Sean Guinness and Tatsuhito Takaiwa (Zero1)

References

Professional wrestling tournaments
Tag team tournaments